K-space can refer to:

Another name for the spatial frequency domain of a spatial Fourier transform
Reciprocal space, containing the reciprocal lattice of a spatial lattice
Momentum space, or wavevector space, the vector space of possible values of momentum for a particle
k-space (magnetic resonance imaging) 
Another name for a compactly generated space in topology
K-space (functional analysis) is an F-space such that every twisted sum by the real line splits
K-Space (band), a British-Siberian music ensemble